Jamie Blazejewski (born 29 November 1977) is a former Australian rugby union player. She made all four of her test appearances for Australia at the 2002 Rugby World Cup in Spain. Her first test match was against Wales in Barcelona. She was later named in the starting line-up against the Black Ferns. Her final appearance for the Wallaroos was against Scotland.

References 

1977 births
Living people
Australian female rugby union players
Australia women's international rugby union players